This page documents all tornadoes confirmed by various weather forecast offices of the National Weather Service in the United States for January, February, and March 2023. Tornado counts are considered preliminary until final publication in the database of the National Centers for Environmental Information. Based on the 1991–2020 average, about 39 tornadoes are typically recorded across the United States during January, about 36 tornadoes are recorded in February, and  about 80 tornadoes are recorded in March. These tornadoes are commonly focused across the Southern United States due to their proximity to the unstable airmass and warm waters of the Gulf of Mexico, as well as California in association with winter storms.

In January 2023, 125 tornadoes were confirmed across the United States, the third highest count on record in that month behind 1999 and 2017. It likewise featured the third most tornado watches on record, at 25. A total of 793 severe weather reports were received by the Storm Prediction Center, which is more than double the 10-year average of 348 reports. Five days featured a level 3/Enhanced risk of severe weather, the most in a January since the implementation of that risk category in 2014. Well above average activity was likely enhanced by the ongoing La Niña. Although the brunt of the tornadic activity was concentrated across the Southern United States, particularly in Alabama which saw its highest number of January tornadoes on record, Iowa saw its first January tornadoes since 1967, and Illinois recorded its highest number of January tornadoes in a single day in 34 years.

February did not see as many tornadoes, but was still above average with 53 tornadoes, making it the 10th most of active February on record. Most of the tornadoes touched down in a moderate outbreak at the end of the month; the outbreak produced 12 tornadoes in Oklahoma, setting the record for the most tornadoes ever recorded in Oklahoma during the month.

United States yearly total

January

January 2 event

January 3 event

January 4 event

January 10 event

January 12 event

January 14 event

January 16 event

January 18 event

January 22 event

January 24 event

January 25 event

February

February 8 event

February 9 event

February 16 event

February 17 event

February 21 event

February 26 event

February 27 event

March

March 1 event

March 2 event

March 3 event

March 11 event

March 12 event

March 16 event

March 17 event

See also
 Tornadoes of 2023
 List of United States tornadoes from November to December 2022

Notes

References 

2023-related lists
Tornadoes of 2023
Tornadoes
February 2023 events in the United States
2023, 1
2023 natural disasters in the United States
Tornadoes in the United States
2023 meteorology